Andrés Franco may refer to:

Andrés Franco (UNICEF), Colombian diplomat and UNICEF official
Andres Franco (high jumper) (1925–2008), Filipino high jumper
Andrés Franco (judoka) (born 1966), Cuban judoka